Uma Chandi Gowri Sankarula Katha is a 1968 Indian Telugu-language Hindu mythological film directed by K. V. Reddy. The film was produced by Nagi Reddi and Chakrapani under the Vijaya Productions banner. It stars N. T. Rama Rao and B. Saroja Devi, with music composed by Pendyala Nageswara Rao. Released on 11 January 1968, the film was a commercial failure.

Plot 
In a debate among Saptarushis where Bhrigu Maharshi argues that the male is responsible for the entire nature and others say nature (female) is the origin of the universe. Bhrigu wanted to clarify his doubt with Siva.

Upon reaching Kailasa, Siva would be teaching lessons on dance to Parvati and since they were in the process, he would be ignored by Parvati and Siva. Losing patience, Bhrigu curses Parvati to take birth three times on Earth and suffer from human-related misfortune. Parvati also curses Bhrigu to take birth as a demon who makes the mankind suffer.

Parvati, upon praying to Siva, receives the favour, that she would take birth only one time, but as triplets and he will take birth to protect her and convert her human-related misfortune into a boon with his company. The crux of the story is all about how Siva meets these three women and how he assassinates the demon (Bhrigu).

In the climax, Siva fights the demon (Bhrigu) and releases him from the curse and at the same time, Parvati also gets released from all her human suffering, turns into a Goddess, and reaches Siva.

Cast 
N. T. Rama Rao as Siva / Sankara
B. Saroja Devi as Uma, Chandi and Gowri
Relangi
Ramana Reddy
Dhulipala
Padmanabham
Allu Ramalingaiah
Mukkamala
Dr. Sivaramakrishnaiah
Rushyendramani
Chayadevi
Girija
Suryakala
Meena Kumari

Soundtrack 

Music composed by Pendyala Nageswara Rao. Lyrics were written by Pingali.

References

Bibliography

External links 
 

1960s Telugu-language films
1968 films
Films directed by K. V. Reddy
Films scored by Pendyala Nageswara Rao
Hindu mythological films